Dapishul is a former Pomo settlement in Mendocino County, California, one of a number of Pomo settlements catalogued by Stephen Powers. It was located in Redwood Valley; its precise location was near Mariposa creek and the Russian River on the eastern bank above the flood plain. In the language of the Pomo, "dapishul" means "high sun", referring a location that is cool and shaded by canyon walls, with the sun only visible when it is high in the sky.

References

Former settlements in Mendocino County, California
Former populated places in California
Pomo villages